Iván Álvarez may refer to:

 Iván Álvarez (cyclist) (born 1981), Spanish cyclist
 Iván Álvarez (footballer, born 1980), Chilean forward
 Iván Álvarez (footballer, born 2000), Argentine midfielder